San Juan Antiguo (not to be confused with the historic district of Old San Juan which is located within this district), is a barrio located in the municipality of San Juan in the Commonwealth of Puerto Rico. San Juan Antiguo has 7 subbarrios.  In 2010, San Juan Antiguo had a population of 7,085 inhabitants and a population density of 2,681.9 people per km2. San Juan Antiguo is entirely located within the Isleta de San Juan, the islet off the coast of Puerto Rico where Old San Juan was settled, connected to the mainland by bridges and a causeway.

History

In the late 19th century, San Juan Antiguo called Plaza de San Juan is where Spain had its war fortifications and military buildings.

Puerto Rico was ceded by Spain in the aftermath of the Spanish–American War under the terms of the Treaty of Paris of 1898 and became an unincorporated territory of the United States. In 1899, the United States Department of War conducted a census of Puerto Rico.

Subbarrios
San Juan Antiguo is divided into the following subbarrios:
 Ballajá
 Catedral
 Marina
 Mercado
 Puerta de Tierra
 San Cristóbal
 San Francisco

Gallery

See also

 Isleta de San Juan
 Avenida Juan Ponce de León
 List of communities in Puerto Rico

References

External links
 

Barrios of San Juan, Puerto Rico
Neighborhoods in Puerto Rico